Hong is a genus of ladybird beetles which contains three species, all of which have only been infrequently found.

Species
The species of this genus differ from one another mostly in the shape of their bodies.
 Hong glorious Ślipiński, 2007
 Hong guerreroi Gonzalez & Escalona, 2013
 Hong slipinskii Gonzalez & Escalona, 2013

See also

 Hong (disambiguation)

References

Coccinellidae genera